Pete Jaquess (born December 25, 1940) is an American and former collegiate and professional football player. He played for the American Football League's Houston Oilers, Miami Dolphins, and Denver Broncos, and for the NFL's Broncos.  He was an AFL All-Star with the Oilers in his rookie year, 1964.

See also
Other American Football League players

1940 births
Living people
People from Lamb County, Texas
Players of American football from Texas
American football defensive backs
Eastern New Mexico Greyhounds football players
Houston Oilers players
Miami Dolphins players
Denver Broncos (AFL) players
American Football League All-Star players
American Football League players